National Highway 130C, commonly referred to as NH 130C is a national highway in  India. It is a spur road of National Highway 30. NH-130C traverses the states of Chhattisgarh and Maharashtra in India.

Route 

 Chhattisgarh

Abhanpur, Rajim, Gariaband, Bardula, Deobhog - Odisha Border.

 Odisha

Chhattisgarh Border - Baldhimal.

Junctions 

  Terminal near Abhanpur.
  Terminal near Baldhimal.

See also 

 List of National Highways in India
 List of National Highways in India by state

References

External links 

 NH 130C on OpenStreetMap

National highways in India
National Highways in Odisha
National Highways in Chhattisgarh